The 2013 S.League season is Woodlands Wellington's 18th competitive and consecutive season in the top flight of Singapore football and 26th year in existence as a football club.

Key dates
 19 November 2012: Woodlands Wellington FC announced that it had signed veteran custodian Yazid Yasin. The goalkeeper has previously played for the Rams between 2004 and 2008 before joining Geylang United during the 2009 S.League season. Yazid already has 124 appearances for Woodlands under his belt, making him the player with the fourth-most number of appearances for the Rams behind Sazali Salleh, Goh Tat Chuan and Laakkad Abdelhadi.
 22 November 2012: A report by The New Paper suggested that Woodlands may have fallen into financial hardship and could be the second club to sit out the 2013 S.League after Gombak United has announced earlier that it would not be taking part in the league in 2013. This sparked off a supporter-driven "Save Woodlands" awareness campaign on the same day. The club held an open meeting with the supporters and press at Woodlands Stadium later that evening and quashed the report, stating that Woodlands was financially in the pink of health. Team manager, Matthew Michael Tay, also said that the club was already preparing a pre-season tour of Malaysia, and that the club would be beefing up its squad with five foreigners and it would also be aiming for a minimum 8th spot in the table this season.
 23 November 2012: The club released a list of six senior players which were retained from 2012, as well as 7 players from the Prime League.
 7 December 2012: On 7 December 2012, Woodlands Wellington completed the transfer of Albirex Niigata (S) midfielder, Atsushi Shimono.
 26 December 2012: Woodlands Wellington took part in a four team pre-season tournament which also involved Malaysia Super League sides Darul Takzim FC and Pahang FA, as well as Malaysia Premier League side Johor United. The Rams lost 1-5 to Darul Takzim FC in the opening match on 26 December with Korean trialist Jang Jo-yoon scoring the only goal for Woodlands in the 50th minute. 
 28 December 2012: Following Johor United's 3-0 victory over Pahang FA on 27 December 2012, Woodlands faced the Tok Gajahs in the 3rd place playoff in which they fielded a side made up of mainly trialists and Prime League players, resulting in a 6-0 loss to Pahang.
 31 December 2012: The club announced that it will play four pre-season friendly matches in January 2013 against SAFFC, Tampines Rovers, Albirex Niigata (S) and Home United respectively.
 1 January 2013: Shahril Alias and Ang Zhiwei's transfers from Geylang United were officially announced by Woodlands Wellington. They are the second and third Eagles to join the Rams after custodian Yazid Yasin's transfer was confirmed earlier. Woodlands also announced the transfer of former Singapore Under-23 international, Hidhir Hasbiallah. The defender returned to the S.League after a two-year absence due to his national service conscription.
 2 January 2013: Woodlands Wellington announces the transfer of Fadhil Noh, who returns to the S.League after playing for Home United in the Prime League due to national service.
 8 January 2013: Taufiq Rahmat becomes the seventh new player to sign for Woodlands Wellington after it announced that the former LionsXII player had put pen to paper for the Rams, marking his return to the S.League after featuring prominently for Tanjong Pagar United in 2011.
 11 January 2013: Former Super Reds and Gombak United striker, Jang Jo-yoon, is confirmed as the third foreigner for the 2013 season.
 12 January 2013: Woodlands Wellington announced that they have signed up experienced campaigner Rosman Sulaiman. The former Singapore international was released by Home United at the end of the 2012 season and had been training with the Rams since the start of January.
 14 January 2013: Former Dutch international, Khalid Hamdaoui is confirmed as the club's fourth foreign signing. Apart from playing for several teams in the Eredivisie, the Dutchman also played for Tokyo Verdy 1969, Dundee F.C. and Raja Casablanca before heading to the S.League.
 15 January 2013: On 15 January 2013, a new logo (as seen below) of Woodlands Wellington, consisting of a Ram's head encased within a shield, surfaced on the Woodlands Wellington official website and Facebook page. The logo's poor design and seemingly similar appearance to another logo belonging to an American elementary school drew much flak from cyberspace. The logo was subsequently removed from both media platforms and The New Paper ran a feature on the logo change itself on 20 January 2013. In the article, Woodlands chairman, Hussainar K. Abdul Aziz was quoted as saying that the club was looking to change the logo to signify a new beginning, but that (particular) logo had not been approved by the club's management, and that the club was investigating how it made its way onto the website. He also revealed that there are three other fan-designed logos that the Rams were considering as their new crest.
 24 January 2013: Woodlands Wellington announced that it will be outfitted by Singaporean sports apparel maker Waga for the 2013 S.League season. Woodlands team manager, Matthew Michael Tay, also believed that long time Rams' fans would be pleasantly surprised by the club's choice of colours for the upcoming season, stating that the yellow and green stripes down the middle for the new home kit bore a striking resemblance to the early home kit which the Rams wore between 1996 and 1997.
 30 January 2013: After impressing the coaching panel in Woodlands' pre-season friendlies against Albirex Niigata (S), Home United and Tampines Rovers, the Rams announced the signing of Korean defender Cho Sung-hwan, its fifth and final foreigner for the 2013 season. Cho joins the Rams from Korean Division 3 side FC Pocheon.
 2 February 2013: Woodlands Wellington held its press conference at Woodlands Galaxy Community Club, where it unveiled its new club advisor, Ms. Ellen Lee Geck Hoon. The public also caught a glimpse of Woodlands' new Ram mascot, as well as the home kit for the 2013 season. In addition to that, Salim Moin also unveiled his new 20 man squad to the media, with the inclusion of his new signing, Shariff Abdul Samat. Midfielder Armanizam Dolah was also named as the team captain for the new season.
 21 February 2013: Woodlands Wellington kicks off the 2013 S.League season with a 2-2 draw against Warriors F.C. Khalid Hamdaoui caps off his impressive debut with an assist for Moon Soon-ho to tap home the opening goal and scores Woodlands Wellington's second goal off Jang Jo-yoon's free kick.
 5 March 2013: Woodlands Wellington beat Home United with a 2-0 scoreline at Bishan Stadium for their first win of the 2013 S.League season. The victory also marked a few milestones in the club's history, with the Rams winning at Bishan for the first time since 1997, while Goh Swee Swee earned his first captaincy in his senior career. Khalid Hamdaoui also scored his third goal in as many games to continue his fine scoring streak.
 15 March 2013: Woodlands Wellington's 'live' game against Hougang United saw a record local turnout of 3,108.
 26 March 2013: The Rams beat Albirex Niigata (S) with a 2-1 scoreline at Woodlands Stadium, ending the White Swans' unbeaten five match run since the start of the 2013 S.League. The match also saw Khalid Hamdaoui notch his fourth goal in five appearances.
 14 April 2013: Woodlands Wellington was drawn to play Geylang International in the Singapore Cup preliminary round during the Cup drawn held at The Float at Marina Bay. The Football Association of Singapore announced on 30 April 2013 that the two sides will play their match on 29 May 2013.
 12 May 2013: Woodlands Wellington was drawn into Group A of the Starhub League Cup alongside Harimau Muda B, Home United and preliminary playoff winners, newly promoted Division One side Admiralty FC. The grouping is significant for the Rams as apart from being a local derby, Admiralty also boasts three former S.League players who turned out for Woodlands in 2012, namely playoff top scorer Guntur Djafril, K Sathiaraj and Shamsurin Abdul Rahman.
 18 May 2013: Woodlands Wellington ends up in 9th spot, their lowest since the start of the season, after their defeat to Harimau Muda B at Pasir Gudang Stadium in Week 13.
 29 May 2013: Woodlands Wellington was knocked out of the RHB Singapore Cup following a 1-4 loss to Geylang International in the preliminary round.
 11 June 2013: Woodlands Wellington progressed to the knock-out stage of the League Cup after finishing as runners-up in Group A.
 16 June 2013: Woodlands Wellington qualified for the semifinals of the League Cup after beating Geylang International 4-1 on penalties in the quarterfinals.

Transfers

In

Pre-season

Mid-season

Out

Pre-season

Mid-season

Squads

First team squad

Club

Coaching staff
{|class="wikitable"
|-
|-
! Position !! Name
|-
|Team Manager ||  Matthew Michael Tay
|-
|Head Coach ||  Salim Moin
|-
|Assistant / Prime League Coach ||  Clement Teo
|-
|Goalkeeping Coach ||  Matthew Michael Tay
|-
|Assistant Goalkeeping Coach ||  Ang Bang Heng
|-
|Centre of Excellence Head Coach||  Mohd Sani Kadim
|-
|Centre of Excellence U16 Coach||  Firdaus Salleh
|-
|Centre of Excellence U14 Coach||  Han Yiguang
|-
|Technical Consultant ||  Keith Tee Tan
|-
|Sports Trainer ||  Billy Ang
|-
|Sports Trainer ||  Gary Lee
|-
|Physiotherapist ||  Melissa Ng
|-
|Kitman ||  Wan Azlan Wan Adanan
|-

Boardroom staff

Updated to games played on 16 July 2013
*Released during mid-season transfer window.

First team goalscoring statistics
Includes all competitive matches. The list is sorted by shirt number when total goals are equal.

Updated to games played on 16 July 2013
*Two of Woodlands Wellington's goals was scored via own goals from opposing players – Sheikh Abdul Hadi during the match against Courts Young Lions on 5 April 2012 and Lau Meng Meng during the match against Hougang United on 26 June 2012.

First team goal assist statistics
Includes all competitive matches. The list is sorted by shirt number when total goals are equal.

Updated to games played on 16 July 2013
*Two goals was not recorded with assists as they was scored via a direct free kick and a penalty kick respectively.
One of Jang Jo-yoon's assists was deflected by Sheikh Abdul Hadi into his own goal during Woodlands Wellington's match against Courts Young Lions on 5 April 2013.
One of Moon Soon-ho's assists was deflected by Lau Meng Meng into his own goal during Woodlands Wellington's match against Hougang United on 26 June 2013.

First team clean sheets
Includes all competitive matches. The list is sorted by shirt number when total clean sheets are equal.

Updated to games played on 16 July 2013

First team disciplinary record
Includes all competitive matches. The list is sorted by shirt number when total cards are equal.

Updated to games played on 16 July 2013

Prime League

Prime League squad

 

 (Captain)

Prime League table

Prime League results summary

Prime League results by round

Prime League matches

Round 1

Match abandoned due to inclement weather.

Round 2

Round 3

Appearances and goals

|-

Prime League goalscoring statistics
Includes all competitive matches. The list is sorted by shirt number when total goals are equal.

Updated to games played on 17 June 2013

Prime League disciplinary record
Includes all competitive matches. The list is sorted by shirt number when total cards are equal.
{| class="wikitable" style="font-size: 95%; text-align: center;"
|-
| rowspan="2" style="width:2.5%; text-align:center;"|
| rowspan="2" style="width:3%; text-align:center;"|
| rowspan="2" style="width:3%; text-align:center;"|
| rowspan="2" style="width:3%; text-align:center;"|
| rowspan="2" style="width:12%; text-align:center;"|Name
| colspan="3" style="text-align:center;"|Prime League
| colspan="3" style="text-align:center;"|FA Cup
| colspan="3" style="text-align:center;"|Total
|-
! style="width:25px; background:#fe9;"|
! style="width:28px; background:#ff8888;"|
! style="width:25px; background:#ff8888;"|
! style="width:25px; background:#fe9;"|
! style="width:28px; background:#ff8888;"|
! style="width:25px; background:#ff8888;"|
! style="width:25px; background:#fe9;"|
! style="width:28px; background:#ff8888;"|
! style="width:25px; background:#ff8888;"|
|-
|rowspan="1"|1
|34
|DF
|
|Hidayat Yanis 
|3
|1
|0
|0
|0
|0
|3
|1
|0
|-
|rowspan="1"|2
|24
|MF
|
|Divesh Rajendran
|9
|0
|0
|0
|0
|0
|9
|0
|0
|-
|rowspan="1"|3
|39
|MF
|
|Adil Yusof
|4
|0
|0
|0
|0
|0
|4
|0
|0
|-
|rowspan="2"|4
|16
|MF
|
|Farouq Farkhan
|3
|0
|0
|0
|0
|0
|3
|0
|0
|-
|40
|DF
|
|Zulkarnain Malik
|3
|0
|0
|0
|0
|0
|3
|0
|0
|-
|rowspan="4"|4
|23
|DF
|
|Dinie Fitri
|2
|0
|0
|0
|0
|0
|2
|0
|0
|-
|27
|FW
|
|Andy Ahmad
|2
|0
|0
|0
|0
|0
|2
|0
|0
|-
|28
|MF
|
|Rahimi Buhari
|2
|0
|0
|0
|0
|0
|2
|0
|0
|-
|31
|FW
|
|Chen Peng
|2
|0
|0
|0
|0
|0
|2
|0
|0
|-
|rowspan="9"|5
|5
|MF
|
|Khalid Hamdaoui
|1
|0
|0
|0
|0
|0
|1
|0
|0
|-
|13
|DF
|
|Shariff Samat
|1
|0
|0
|0
|0
|0
|1
|0
|0
|-
|15
|FW
|
|Fadhil Noh
|1
|0
|0
|0
|0
|0
|1
|0
|0
|-
|17
|FW
|
|Farizal Basri
|1
|0
|0
|0
|0
|0
|1
|0
|0
|-
|19
|MF
|
|Ridhwan Osman
|1
|0
|0
|0
|0
|0
|1
|0
|0
|-
|22
|DF
|
|Fariss Haiqel
|1
|0
|0
|0
|0
|0
|1
|0
|0
|-
|29
|DF
|
|Aidil Malik
|1
|0
|0
|0
|0
|0
|1
|0
|0
|-
|32
|MF
|
|Khamarul Majid
|1
|0
|0
|0
|0
|0
|1
|0
|0
|-
|39
|MF
|
|Aidil Yusof
|1
|0
|0
|0
|0
|0
|1
|0
|0
|-
|colspan="4"|
|TOTALS
|39
|1
|0
|0
|0
|0
|39
|1
|0
|-

References

Woodlands Wellington
Woodlands Wellington FC seasons